Pierre Kemp (1 December 1886 – 21 July 1967) was a Dutch poet and painter, the recipient of the Constantijn Huygens Prize in 1956 and the P. C. Hooft Award in 1958.  His younger brother was the writer Mathias Kemp.

Kemp was born in Maastricht and died there in 1967.

Works

 1914 - Het wondere lied
 1916 - De bruid der onbekende zee en andere gedichten
 1925 - Limburgs Sagenboek
 1928 - Carmina Matrimonalia
 1934 - Stabielen en passanten
 1935 - Zuster Beatrijs
 1938 - Fugitieven en constanten
 1940 - Transitieven en immobielen
 1946 - Pacific
 1946 - Standard-book of classic blacks
 1947 - Phototropen en noctophilen 
 1949 - Forensen voor Cythère en andere gedichten
 1956 - Engelse verfdoos
 1958 - Vijf families en één poederblauw
 1959 - Emeritaat
 1959 - Garden, 36, 22, 36 inches
 1960 - Les Folies Maestrichtoises
 1961 - De incomplete luisteraar
 1961 - Au Pays du Tendre mosan
 1965 - Perzische suite voor Dr. E.F. Tijdens
 1976 - Verzameld werk

References
Profile at the Digital library for Dutch literature

1886 births
1967 deaths
Dutch poets
Writers from Maastricht
Constantijn Huygens Prize winners
P. C. Hooft Award winners